Since 2003, the Einstein Prize is a biennial prize awarded by the American Physical Society. The recipients are chosen for their outstanding accomplishments in the field of gravitational physics. The prize is named after Albert Einstein (1879-1955), who authored the theories of special and general relativity. The prize was established by the Topical Group on Gravitation at the beginning of 1999. As of 2013, the prize is valued at $10,000.

Recipients

See also
 Albert Einstein Award, (Lewis and Rosa Strauss Memorial Fund)
 Albert Einstein Medal, (Albert Einstein Society, Bern)
 Albert Einstein World Award of Science, (World Cultural Council)
 List of physics awards

External links
 Einstein Prize, American Physical Society

Awards established in 2003
Awards of the American Physical Society
Albert Einstein